The Brighton trolleybus system formerly served the town of Brighton, East Sussex, England.

By the standards of the various now defunct trolleybus systems in the United Kingdom, the Brighton system was a moderately sized one, with a total of nine routes. It was also unusual, in that it had two operators.

The main operator of the system was Brighton Corporation Transport, which owned the wires, and at its peak had a fleet of 52 trolleybuses.

Two of the former Brighton trolleybuses are now preserved.  One is at the Science Museum annexe at Swindon, and the other is at the East Anglia Transport Museum, Carlton Colville, Suffolk. The latter vehicle, no 52, is preserved in the livery of Maidstone Corporation, which acquired it and used it on the Maidstone trolleybus system, following the closure of the Brighton system.

See also

Transport in Brighton and Hove
List of trolleybus systems in the United Kingdom

References

Notes

Further reading

External links

SCT'61 website – photos and descriptions of Brighton Corporation trolleybuses and early motorbuses.
Brighton Hove & District Transport trolleybus historical site
National Trolleybus Archive
British Trolleybus Society, based in Reading.
National Trolleybus Association, based in London.

Brighton
History of Brighton and Hove
Brighton
Brighton